Erich Schmidt (20 June 1853, in Jena – 29 April 1913, in Berlin) was a German historian of literature.

Biography
He was the son of a zoologist Oskar Schmidt. He studied Germanic philology and literary history at Graz, Jena, and Strassburg, established himself as privatdozent at Würzburg in 1875, became a professor at Strassburg in 1877, at Vienna in 1880, and director of the Goethe archive at Weimar in 1885. Thence he was called to Berlin in 1887, to succeed Wilhelm Scherer in the chair of German language and literature. From 1907 onward, he served as president of the Goethe Society.

Published works 
Devoted almost exclusively to the investigation of modern literature, being the distinguished author of works involving writers and German literature of the 18th and 19th century, he published:
 Richardson, Rousseau, und Goethe (1875) – Samuel Richardson, Jean-Jacques Rousseau and Johann Wolfgang von Goethe.
 Lenz und Klinger (1878) – Jakob Michael Reinhold Lenz, Friedrich Maximilian Klinger.
 Heinrich Leopold Wagner (1879) – Heinrich Leopold Wagner.
 Beiträge zur Kenntnis der Klopstockschen Jugendlyrik (1880).
 Komödien vom Studentenleben aus dem sechzehnten und siebzehnten Jahrhundert. Vortrag gehalten auf der Trier Philologenversammlung. Leipzig 1880. (Digitalisat)
 Charakteristiken (1st series 1880; 2d series 1900).
 A biography of Gotthold Ephraim Lessing, titled Lessing: Geschichte seines Lebens und seiner Schriften (2d edition 1899).

He edited:
 Two volumes of the Schriften der Goethe-Gesellschaft (Weimar, 1886 and 1893)
 Faust, for the Weimar edition
 Goethe's Faust in ursprünglicher Gestalt (Goethe's Faust in its original form; 3rd edition, 1894) which was discovered by him in Dresden.

Notes

References
 

1853 births
1913 deaths
Writers from Jena
People from Saxe-Weimar-Eisenach
19th-century German historians
German literary historians
German male non-fiction writers
University of Graz alumni
University of Jena alumni
University of Strasbourg alumni
Academic staff of the University of Strasbourg
Academic staff of the University of Vienna
Academic staff of the Humboldt University of Berlin
Members of the Prussian Academy of Sciences
20th-century German historians